Balderstone may refer to:

Places
Balderstone, Greater Manchester, a district and an electoral ward of the wider Metropolitan Borough of Rochdale in Greater Manchester, England
Balderstone Technology College, a school in Balderstone, Greater Manchester
Balderstone, Lancashire, a village and civil parish in the Ribble Valley district of Lancashire, England

People
Chris Balderstone (1940–2000), English professional footballer and cricketer
Sir James Balderstone (1921–2014), Australian director of public companies

See also
Balderston (disambiguation)
Baulderstone, Australian construction company